Consider the Lilies is a religious album released by the Mormon Tabernacle Choir. The album was originally released in 2003.  The music in this first album on the choir's new label represents a broad range of musical feeling—from the joyful "Rejoice, the Lord is King!" and "Morning Has Broken" to the contemplative "O Holy Jesus" and "Pilgrims' Hymn" to the fervent affirmations in "I Believe in Christ" and "This Is the Christ."

Track listing
"For the Beauty of the Earth" (John Rutter) - 3:21
"O Holy Jesus" (Jonathan Willcocks) - 3:36
"Morning Has Broken" - 2:16
"As the Bridegroom to His Chosen" (Rutter) - 3:51
"I Sing the Mighty Power of God" (Mack Wilberg) - 2:18
"He Shall Feed His Flock" (John Ness Beck) - 3:10
"My Shepherd Will Supply My Need" - 4:52
"The Lord Bless You and Keep You" (Rutter) - 2:56
"I'm Trying to Be Like Jesus" (Janice Kapp Perry) - 4:38
"Rejoice, the Lord is King!" (Malcolm Archer) - 2:32
"Jesu, the Very Thought Is Sweet" (Wilberg) - 6:14
"Pilgrims' Hymn" (Stephen Paulus) - 3:35
"I Believe in Christ" (John Longhurst) - 4:54
"God! So Loved the World" (Carl J. Nygard, Jr.) - 4:10
"This Is the Christ" (Michael F. Moody) - 5:12
"For I Am Called by Thy Name" (Crawford Gates) - 1:58
"Consider the Lilies" (Roger Hoffman) - 5:18

Personnel

Craig D. Jessop – music direction
John Longhurst – organ
Clay Christiansen – organ
Richard L. Elliott – organ
Mormon Tabernacle Choir – chorus
Orchestra at Temple Square – orchestra
Ann Turner – choir manager
Chris Acton – assistant engineer
Barlow Bradford – associate director, producer
Mac Christensen – choir president
Scott Eggers – cover art direction
Shauna Gibby – design
Bruce Leek – producer, mastering, engineer, editing
Milo Lefler – engineering support
Alex Morris – stage manager
Lynn Robinson – engineering support
Gaylen Smith – engineering support
Jim Turner – stage manager
Fred Vogler – producer, engineer, editing
Mack Wilberg – associate director, producer
Wolfgang Zeisler – engineering support

External links
 Tabernacle Choir's Official Website album link

References

2003 albums
Christian music albums by American artists
Tabernacle Choir albums